Seh Chah Gelal (also Romanized as Seh Chāh Gelāl; also known as Seh Chāh) is a village in Chin Rural District, Ludab District, Boyer-Ahmad County, Kohgiluyeh and Boyer-Ahmad Province, Iran. At the 2006 census, its population was 37, in 8 families.

References 

Populated places in Boyer-Ahmad County